Marco Da Silva (born May 30, 1977), is a Portuguese dancer and choreographer. He was born in Bremen, West Germany in a family of Portuguese descent. His experience as a dancer includes several tours by Kylie Minogue, promotional tours for Minogue's singles ("Wow", In My Arms") and Britney Spears's Femme Fatale Tour. His dancing experience also includes ex-Spice Girl Geri Halliwell, TV commercials for Coca-Cola, films as "The Muppets – The Musical Movie", and music videos such as Kylie Minogue's "All I See", "In My Arms", Mariah Carey's "Thank God I Found You", Erika Jayne's "Pretty Mess", Ninel Conde's "Vivir Asi", and George Michael's "25 Tour".

Live / Stage performances
Da Silva's work as a background dancer which includes four tours by Kylie Minogue. He is featured as a dancer and served as lead music video choreographer for several recording artists.

Tours
Britney Spears - Femme Fatale Tour (2011)
Kylie Minogue - For You, for Me (2009)
Kylie Minogue - KylieX2008 (2008)
Kylie Minogue - Showgirl: The Homecoming Tour (2006–07)
Kylie Minogue - Showgirl: The Greatest Hits Tour (2005)
Jeanette Biedermann - Rock My Life Tour (2003)

Promotional performances
Kylie Minogue - promotional tours for "Wow" and "In My Arms"
Geri Halliwell - promotional tour 
Erika Jayne - promotional tour for "Pretty Mess"

Musicals
Mamma Mia! - Musical - Dancer / Eddie West Side Story - Chino

Music videos
Kylie Minogue - "All I See" - Lead / Choreographer 
Kylie Minogue - "Wow"
Kylie Minogue - "In My Arms"
George Micheal - "25 Live" - Screens - Lead
Ninel Conde - "Vivir así es morir de amor" - Dancer
Noelia - "Here I Go Again" - Dancer, associate choreographer
Erika Jayne - "Pretty Mess" - Dancer
Mariah Carey - "Thank God I Found You" - Extra
Laura Bell Bundy - "Giddy On Up" - Dancer
No Angels - "Something About Us", "Feel Good Lies"
AVA - "Crazy" - Principal dancer 
No Angels - "Feel Good Lies" - Dancer 
No Angels - "Something About Us" - Dancer 
No Angels - "No Angel" - Dancer

Promotional films / Commercials
Video Music Awards 2011 - Trailer / Dancer for Britney Spears 
US CENSUS Bureau - Principal 
Muppets – The Musical Movie - Dancer 
Coca Cola ad - Lead with Nancy Ajram

References

External links 

 

1977 births
Living people
Entertainers from Bremen
American people of Portuguese descent